John Liew may refer to:

John Liew (MP)
John Liew, co-founder of AQR Capital